Spodumene is a pyroxene mineral consisting of lithium aluminium inosilicate, LiAl(SiO3)2, and is a source of lithium. It occurs as colorless to yellowish, purplish, or lilac kunzite (see below), yellowish-green or emerald-green hiddenite, prismatic crystals, often of great size.

The naturally-occurring low-temperature form α-spodumene is in the monoclinic system , and the high-temperature β-spodumene crystallizes in the tetragonal system. α-spodumene converts to β-spodumene at temperatures above 900 °C. Crystals are typically heavily striated parallel to the principal axis. Crystal faces are often etched and pitted with triangular markings.

Discovery and occurrence

Spodumene was first described in 1800 for an occurrence in the type locality in Utö, Södermanland, Sweden. It was discovered by Brazilian naturalist Jose Bonifacio de Andrada e Silva. The name is derived from the Greek spodumenos (σποδούμενος), meaning "burnt to ashes", owing to the opaque ash-grey appearance of material refined for use in industry.

Spodumene occurs in lithium-rich granite pegmatites and aplites. Associated minerals include: quartz, albite, petalite, eucryptite, lepidolite and beryl.

Transparent material has long been used as a gemstone with varieties kunzite and hiddenite noted for their strong pleochroism. Source localities include Democratic Republic of Congo, Afghanistan, Australia, Brazil, Madagascar (see mining), Pakistan, Québec in Canada, and North Carolina and California in the U.S.

Since 2018, the Democratic Republic of Congo (DRC) has been known to have the largest lithium spodumene hard rock deposit in the world, with mining operations occurring in the central DRC territory of Manono, Tanganyika Province. 
The total resource of the deposit located in Manono has the potential to be in the magnitude of 1.5 billion tons of high-grade low-impurities lithium spodumene hard-rock. The two largest pegmatites (known as the Carriere de l'Este Pegmatite and the Roche Dure Pegmatite) are each of similar size or larger than the Greenbushes Pegmatite in Western Australia. By 2023, the Democratic Republic of Congo is expected to be a significant supplier of lithium to the world by means of its high-grade and low-impurity spodumene. As of 2021, the Australian company AVZ Minerals is developing the Manono Lithium and Tin project and has a resource size of 400 million tonnes of high grade low impurities at 1.65% lithium oxide (Li2O) spodumene hard-rock based on studies and drilling of Roche Dure, one of several pegmatites in the deposit.

Economic importance
Spodumene is an important source of lithium, for use in ceramics, mobile phone and batteries (including for automotive applications), medicine, Pyroceram and as a fluxing agent. As of 2019, around half of  lithium is extracted from mineral ores, which mainly consist of spodumene. Lithium is extracted from spodumene by fusing in acid after roasting to convert it to the more reactive β-spodumene. The advantage of spodumene as a lithium source compared to brine sources is the higher lithium concentration, but at a higher extraction cost.

In 2016, the price was forecast to be $500–600/ton for years to come. However, price spiked above $800 in January 2018, and production increased more than consumption, reducing the price to $400 in September 2020. 

World production of lithium via spodumene was around 80,000 metric tonnes per annum in 2018, primarily from the Greenbushes pegmatite of Western Australia and from some Chinese and Chilean sources. The Talison Minerals mine in Greenbushes, Western Australia (involving Tianqi Lithium, Albemarle Corporation and Global Advanced Metals), is reported to be the world's 2nd largest and to have the highest grade of ore at 2.4% Li2O (2012 figures).

In 2020, Australia expanded spodumene mining to become the leading lithium producing country in the world.

Extraction of lithium from spodumene is challenging due to the tight binding of lithium in the crystal structure. Processing methods rely on roasting at high temperature with various reagents. Suitable extraction reagents include alkali metal sulfates, such as sodium sulfate; sodium carbonate; chlorine; or hydrofluoric acid.

An important economic concentrate of spodumene, known as spodumene concentrate 6 or SC6, is a high-purity lithium ore with approximately 6 percent lithium content being produced as a raw material for the subsequent production of lithium-ion batteries for electric vehicles.

Gemstone varieties

Hiddenite
Hiddenite is a pale, emerald-green gem variety first reported from Alexander County, North Carolina, U.S. It was named in honor of William Earl Hidden (16 February 1853 - 12 June 1918), mining engineer, mineral collector, and mineral dealer.

This emerald-green variety of spodumene is colored by chromium, just as for emeralds. Not all green spodumene is colored with chromium, which tend to have a lighter color, and therefore are not true hiddenite.

Kunzite
Kunzite is a purple-colored gemstone, a variety of spodumene, with the color coming from minor to trace amounts of manganese. Exposure to sunlight can fade its color.

Kunzite was discovered in 1902, and was named after George Frederick Kunz, Tiffany & Co's chief jeweler at the time, and a noted mineralogist. It has been found in Brazil, the U.S., Canada, CIS, Mexico, Sweden, Western Australia, Afghanistan and Pakistan.

Triphane
Triphane is the name used for yellowish varieties of spodumene.

See also
List of minerals

Notes

References
 Kunz, George Frederick (1892). Gems and Precious Stones of North America. New York: The Scientific Publishing Company.
 Palache, C., Davidson, S. C., and Goranson, E. A. (1930). "The Hiddenite deposit in Alexander County, N. Carolina". American Mineralogist Vol. 15 No. 8 p. 280
 Webster, R. (2000). Gems: Their Sources, Descriptions and Identification (5th ed.), pp. 186–190. Great Britain: Butterworth-Heinemann.
 The key players in Quebec lithium , "Daily News", The Northern Miner, 11 August 2010.

External links

 

Aluminium minerals
Gemstones
Inosilicates
Lithium minerals
Monoclinic minerals
Minerals in space group 15
Pyroxene group